The 1997 All-Ireland Senior Camogie Championship Final was the 66th All-Ireland Final and the deciding match of the 1997 All-Ireland Senior Camogie Championship, an inter-county camogie tournament for the top teams in Ireland.

Cork had a four-point win with Lynn Dunlea scoring 0-10.

References

All-Ireland Senior Camogie Championship Final
All-Ireland Senior Camogie Championship Final
All-Ireland Senior Camogie Championship Final, 1997
All-Ireland Senior Camogie Championship Finals
Cork county camogie team matches